Coco Mademoiselle is a women's perfume by French fashion house Chanel, introduced in 2001 for younger consumers. The fragrance was created by Jacques Polge, the nose of Chanel from 1978 to 2015.

Coco Mademoiselle le Film 
In 2006, Chanel launched a new advertising film starring its current spokesmodel Keira Knightley as Coco Chanel. The film was directed by the upcoming English BAFTA-winning director Joe Wright, who has also worked with Knightley in his award-winning films Pride & Prejudice (2005) and Atonement (2007). The soul singer Joss Stone re-recorded Nat King Cole's 1965 "L-O-V-E" for the short film.

Advertisements 
In 2014, an advertisement directed by Wright was shot in the Cité du Cinéma by Luc Besson with Knightley and Danila Kozlovsky in the lead roles.

Notes 
Top notes: orange, bergamot, mandarin, Tunisian curaçao
Middle notes: morning rose, Italian jasmine, ylang-ylang, mimosa, florentine iris
Base notes:  patchouli, Haitian vetiver, Bourbon vanilla, white musk, opoponax, tonka bean

Spokesmodels 
Famous spokesmodels for the fragrance have included Kate Moss, Knightley and Whitney Peak (current).

See also 
 Coco, the 1984 perfume created by Polge for Chanel

References 

Perfumes
Chanel perfumes